A cant in architecture is an angled (oblique-angled) line or surface that cuts off a corner.
Something with a cant is canted.

Canted facades are a typical of, but not exclusive to, Baroque architecture. The angle breaking the facade is less than a right angle, thus enabling a canted facade to be viewed as, and remain, one composition. Bay windows frequently have canted sides.

A cant is sometimes synonymous with chamfer and bevel.

References

Architectural elements
Building engineering